Archipsocidae is a family of barklice of the order Psocodea (formerly Psocoptera) belonging to the suborder Psocomorpha. Members of the family are characterized by their reduced wing venation. Some species are viviparous. The family includes about 80 species in five genera.

References

Sources
Lienhard, C. & Smithers, C. N. 2002. Psocoptera (Insecta): World Catalogue and Bibliography. Instrumenta Biodiversitatis, vol. 5. Muséum d'histoire naturelle, Genève.

External links
 Archipsocus nomas, a webbing barklouse on the UF / IFAS  Featured Creatures Web site

 
Psocoptera families